The MAMA Award for Best Asian Artist is an award presented by Mnet and CJ E&M Pictures at the annual South Korean-based MAMA Awards. It was first awarded at the 2004 Mnet KM Music Video Festival ceremony with genre specific categories. Artists from around East and Southeast Asia have received the awards, and it is given in honor of artist(s) with the best performance in the music industry in their respective countries or region.

Best Asian Artist Award

Best New Asian Artist

Genre-specific

Others

Notes
 Each year is linked to the article about the Mnet Asian Music Awards held that year.

Sources

References

External links
 Mnet Asian Music Awards official website

MAMA Awards